Ayudha Porattam is a 2011 Indian Tamil-language action drama film directed by actor Jai Akash and starring himself, Preethi Minal  and Anita Reddy  in the lead roles.

Plot 
The employees of Field Weapon Factory (F. W. F), a company that manufactures weapons and sends them to Sri Lanka, are sent to Sri Lanka by their boss. After arriving in Sri Lanka, Bhumika (Preethi Minal) falls in love with Jai (Jai Akash), and Rekha (Anita Reddy) falls in love with another man. Ganesh (Theepetti Ganesan) is also in love with Rekha. Jai and Ganesh smoke ganja (marijuana), but Jai stops the bad habit for Bhumika. While the employees are feeling the nation, they meet a freedom fighter leader (Jai Akash) who wants to kill the employees as their company is responsible for the deaths of many people. How Jai convinces the leader to spare his life forms the rest of the plot.

Cast 
Jai Akash as Jai / Freedom fighter leader (dual role)
Preethi Minal as Bhumika
Anita Reddy as Rekha 
Theepetti Ganesan as Ganesh
Sai Kiran as Sai
Adith Seenivas as Hussain

Production  
This film was shot in China, Hong Kong, and Thailand. The songs were scheduled to be shot in London, France and Germany. Ayudha Porattam is about Tamil people from India meeting Sri Lankan Tamils.

Soundtrack 
The songs were composed by Nandhan Raj, who also collaborated with Akash for Kadhalan Kadhali (2012). The first CD from the audio launch was given by Vijay Antony to Prabhu Solomon. The trailer was released by P. L. Thenappan and received by Kalaipuli Sekharan.  Additional music was composed by S.S. Athreya with Snehan as the lyricist.

Reception

Critical response 
The New Indian Express gave the film a negative review and wrote that "Ayudha Porattam is confused issues, and misguided direction. A few more misadventures such as this, rather than resurrecting the hero’s dipping career, will, on the contrary, make it non-existent". Sify gave a similar review and stated that " The basic premise of the story is interesting, but the screenplay and characters are half-baked".

Box office 
The film was a dud at the Chennai box office.

References 

Indian action drama films
Films set in Sri Lanka
2011 action drama films
2011 films
2010s Tamil-language films